Rõhu is a village in Tartu City, Tartu County in Estonia.

References

Villages in Tartu County